Irattakuttikalude Achan is a 1997 Indian Malayalam-language family drama film written by Sreenivasan and directed by Sathyan Anthikad. It stars Jayaram and Manju Warrier in the lead roles, while Murali, Urmila Unni, Sreenivasan and Lalu Alex appears in supporting roles. The film was remade in Telugu as Ooyala (1998).

Plot

The story revolves around the life of Rajeevan who elopes with a rich girl. Later when persuaded he gives away one of his twin children to a stranger who lost all his children at birth.

Cast
 Jayaram as Rajeevan
 Manju Warrier as Anupama Rajeevan
 Murali as Venu
 Urmila Unni as Devi
 Sreenivasan as Constable Sahadevan
 Lalu Alex as Doctor
Vishnuprakash
Kavya Madhavan
Manju Pillai as Indira
Krishnakumar as Robert
 Master Akashlal as Twins

Soundtrack

References

External links
 

1990s Malayalam-language films
Films directed by Sathyan Anthikad
Films with screenplays by Sreenivasan
Films scored by Johnson